Oliver M. Rousseau (born 1891, San Francisco - d. 1977, San Francisco) was a home builder, developer, contractor, and  architect, who worked in the San Francisco Bay Area, in particular the Sunset District of San Francisco, as well as Hayward. Homes he built are commonly referred to as "Rousseaus", and were a departure from the cookie-cutter homes prevalent in the Sunset at the time. Herb Caen wrote, upon his death, "Another Memorial Day death: Oliver Rousseau, who built good houses while all about him, the pure schlock was rising."

References

External links
"The Outer Sunset" weblog, with images of Rousseaus

Architects from California
Architecture in the San Francisco Bay Area
1891 births
1977 deaths
History of Hayward, California
Sunset District, San Francisco
20th-century American architects